Herman Stephen Murray (February 4, 1894 – January 9, 1963) was a Canadian politician. He served in the Legislative Assembly of New Brunswick as member of the Liberal party from 1944 to 1956.

References

1894 births
1963 deaths
New Brunswick Liberal Association MLAs